The Type 23 frigate or Duke class is a class of frigates built for the United Kingdom's Royal Navy. The ships are named after British Dukes, thus leading to the class being commonly known as the Duke class. The first Type 23, was commissioned in 1989, and the sixteenth,  was commissioned in June 2002. They form the core of the Royal Navy's destroyer and frigate fleet and serve alongside the Type 45 destroyers. They were designed for anti-submarine warfare, but have been used for a range of uses. Twelve Type 23 frigates remain in service with the Royal Navy, with three vessels having been sold to the Chilean Navy, and one being retired in 2021.

The Royal Navy's Type 23 frigates will be replaced by the Type 26 Global Combat Ship and the Type 31 frigate.  it is anticipated that HMS St Albans will be the last to retire from the Royal Navy, in 2035.

Development
When first conceived in the late 1970s, the Type 23 was intended to be a light anti-submarine frigate with a towed array sonar to counter Soviet nuclear submarines operating in the North Atlantic. The Type 23 would be replacing the  frigates (which had entered service in the 1960s) and the Type 21 frigate (a general purpose design that had recently entered service) as the backbone of the Royal Navy's surface ship anti-submarine force. The procurement of the class was announced in the 1981 Defence White Paper as "simpler and cheaper than the Type 22 [with] its characteristics... framed with an eye to the export market as well as Royal Navy needs."

The ship was designed by the Royal Corps of Naval Constructors, in close partnership with the prime contractor, Yarrow Shipbuilders. No anti-air warfare system was planned, however the lessons learned during the Falklands War led to the introduction of the vertically launched Sea Wolf missile; In June 1984 BAe Dynamics was awarded a development contract for the missile system. Unlike conventional Sea Wolf, the missile is boosted vertically until it clears the ship's superstructure, and then turns to fly directly to the target. Consequently, the ship's structure does not impose no-fire directions that would delay or inhibit missile firing in a conventionally launched system. With the addition of Harpoon surface-to-surface missiles and a medium calibre gun for naval gunfire support, the Type 23 had evolved into a more complex and balanced vessel optimised for general warfare, which introduced a host of new technologies and concepts to the Royal Navy. These included extensive radar cross-section reduction design measures, automation to substantially reduce crew size, a combined diesel-electric and gas (CODLAG) propulsion system providing very quiet running for anti-submarine operations and a large range.

In December 1986 the procurement of a Ferranti command and control system was cancelled as the specification was deemed to be insufficient to meet the demands of a modern warship, particularly the processing demands of the towed sonar array. Dowty-Sema won a contract for a replacement command and control system in August 1989, however the delay meant early Type 23s entered service without the capability to use the Sea Wolf missile system in combat.

It was reported in 1998 to the House of Commons that: "Type 23 frigates achieved approximately 85–89 per cent average availability for operational service in each of the last five years with the exception of 1996 when the figure dropped to just over 80 per cent due to a number of ships experiencing a particular defect. This discounts time spent in planned maintenance."

Unlike the Type 45 destroyer, the "Type 23 frigate does not have the capability or configuration to act as flagship and is not tasked in this way."

Programme costs
Prior to the Falklands War the cost of the Type 23 frigates was estimated at £75 million each (September 1980 prices) Changes following the experiences in the Falklands, including improved damage control and fire precautions, led to an increased cost estimated at £110 million (1984–85 prices)
The Ministry of Defence said in 1998 that the Merlin ASW helicopter was costing them £97M each (this was for an order for 44 airframes), and that this was 57% of the cost of Type 23. From this it can be calculated that the cost of Type 23 was £170.1M each. The Government's declared policy for construction contracts for Type 23 was "...competition, the aim being to secure best value for money for the defence budget." while maintaining "sufficient warship-building capacity to meet likely future defence requirements and a competitive base"

HMS Norfolk was the first of the class to enter service, commissioned into the Fleet on 1 June 1990 at a cost of £135.449 million GBP, later vessels cost £60–96 million GBP.

Upgrades and future technologies

Mid-life refit
The class underwent mid-life refits which lasted 12–18 months and cost £15-20m. Although the top speed of the Duke class is commonly quoted as 28 knots, the caption of an official Navy photo suggests that Lancaster was capable of 32 knots even before her mid-life refit. The Sea Wolf Mid Life Update (SWMLU) improves the sensors and guidance of the missiles, point defences are further improved with new remotely operated 30 mm guns, and Mod 1 of the Mk8 main gun has an all-electric loading system and a smaller radar cross-section. The communications and command systems are also upgraded.

A further Life Extension (LIFEX) Upkeep project saw the Sea Wolf missiles replaced with the new Sea Ceptor anti-air defence missiles; these were first test-fired from HMS Argyll on 4 September 2017.

Sonar 2087

Sonar 2087 is described by its manufacturer as "a towed-array system that enables Type 23 frigates to hunt the latest submarines at considerable distances and locate them beyond the range at which they [submarines] can launch an attack." Sonar 2087 was fitted to eight Type 23 frigates in mid-life refits between 2004 and 2012; the five oldest Type 23 frigates, HMS Montrose, Monmouth, Iron Duke, Lancaster and Argyll are not scheduled to receive Sonar 2087. These ships will instead continue to be employed across the normal range of standing Royal Navy deployments. The Chilean Navy is procuring a number of Sonar 2087 towed arrays from Thales Underwater Systems to equip its multipurpose frigates.

Artisan 3D radar

The Type 23's original medium-range radar was replaced by BAE Systems Type 997 Artisan 3D radar; the project was worth £100 million and the contract was announced on 4 August 2008. It is a medium-range radar designed to be capable of operating effectively in littoral zones and improving air-defence, anti-surface (anti-ship) and air traffic management capabilities of the Type 23 frigates. The radar is also designed to combat complex jammers. HMS Iron Duke was the first Type 23 frigate to receive the Artisan radar during her refit in 2012–13.

It is claimed the radar is five times more capable than the Type 996 radar it replaces.

Common Anti-Air Modular Missile

CAMM(M), the maritime variant of the Common Anti-Air Modular Missile, started to replace the Sea Wolf missiles on the Type 23 frigates from 2016. CAMM(M) has a longer range of 1–25+ km compared to the 1–10 km offered by the Sea Wolf missile. An option exists to give the missile a surface-attack capability, though it is currently understood the Royal Navy will not take that option, because of cost. Like Sea Wolf, CAMM(M) will be VLS launched; however due to its design, CAMM(M) can be packed much more tightly into the VLS, with up to four CAMM(M) fitting into the space occupied by one Sea Wolf missile. CAMM(M) is known as Sea Ceptor in Royal Navy service.

Martlet Lightweight Multirole Missile 
On an unspecified date in early 2019,  tested a modified mounting for the 30mm cannon which incorporated a launcher for five 'Martlet' Lightweight Multirole Missiles, by firing four of them at a small speedboat target at the Aberporth range in Wales. The concept of mounting the missile alongside the 30mm Bushmaster cannon was tested just 5 months after the idea's conception.

The intended role of the Martlet is to further extend the Type 23's capabilities against small, fast moving targets beyond the current 30mm, GPMG and Minigun options to provide a long range 'stand-off' ability. It is not yet clear whether the Royal Navy intends to equip any more Type 23s with the system.

Anti-ship missile 

In March 2019, a study was commenced for an interim replacement for the ageing Harpoon anti-ship missiles, until completion of the Anglo-French Future Cruise/Anti-Ship Weapon (FC/ASW) programme, scheduled to enter service in the 2030s. The interim replacement missile was originally planned to be fitted to five of the newer Type 23 frigates. 

In November 2021, then First Sea Lord, Admiral Tony Radakin, told the House of Commons Select Defence Committee that the program "had been paused" and seemed likely to be cancelled. In February 2022, the project was stated as having been cancelled. 

However, in July 2022 the Defence Secretary confirmed to the Select Defence Committee that the program had been restarted and was "in negotiation now". In November 2022, it was announced that the Royal Navy would receive the Naval Strike Missile (NSM), which will be fitted to a total of 11 vessels, both Type 23 frigates and Type 45 destroyers.

In 2021, it was reported that only two frigates, Montrose and Kent, were deployed with a full load of eight Harpoon canisters per ship. In August 2022, it was reported that in preparation for her planned deployment to the Persian Gulf to replace HMS Montrose, HMS Lancaster had also been fitted with a full complement of eight Harpoon anti-ship missiles.

Weapons, countermeasures, capabilities and sensors

Anti-air warfare
 Type 997 Artisan 3D radar installed/being installed on 12 of 13 vessels replacing previous Type 996 Mod 1, 3D surveillance and target indication radar.
 12 of 13 Royal Navy frigates (plus the Chilean vessels) are being upgraded with 32-cell Sea Ceptor GWS.35 VLS canisters (range of over ) as replacement for the previous Sea Wolf SAM. HMS Argyll was the first ship to receive Sea Ceptor, completing refit in February 2017. As of 2021 in addition to Argyll, Westminster, Montrose, Northumberland, Kent, Lancaster, Richmond and Portland have all received Sea Ceptor systems. Somerset returned to service with Sea Ceptor in March 2022, while the refits of Iron Duke and St Albans are underway. Sutherland is the final frigate to receive the upgrade which began in April 2021. The 2021 defence white paper announced that Monmouth will not receive the upgrade and, together with Montrose, would be retired early. Monmouth was formally withdrawn from service in June 2021.

Anti-ship warfare (missiles)
 Up to eight Harpoon anti-ship missile launchers (to be fully withdrawn from and replaced, from 2023/24, on eleven Type 23 frigates and Type 45 destroyers by the Naval Strike Missile).
 Up to one embarked Agusta Westland AW159 Wildcat helicopter potentially equipped with Martlet anti-ship missiles or Sea Venom anti-ship missiles (as of 2021).

Anti-submarine warfare
 A Thales Underwater Systems Type 2050 bow sonar scheduled to be replaced by an Ultra Electronics Type 2150 next generation ASW bow sonar in due course.
 An Ultra Electronics Type 2031Z towed sonar on five of the Type 23 frigates – no longer in RN service.
 A Type 2087 towed sonar on eight of the Type 23 frigates.
 2× twin 12.75 in (324 mm) magazine launched torpedo tubes built by SEA Ltd for anti-submarine Sting Ray torpedoes. The tubes are magazine reloaded.
 Up to one embarked Agusta Westland AW159 Wildcat or one AgustaWestland EH101 Merlin helicopter can be equipped with 2-4× anti-submarine Sting Ray torpedoes respectively. An embarked Merlin HM2 helicopter is equipped with its own dipping sonar, sonobuoys and radars; For submarine targets, Wildcat relies on the ship's sensors.

Guns
 1× BAE Systems 4.5 inch Mark 8 naval gun.
 2× 30mm DS30M Mark 2 Automated Small Calibre Guns or 30mm DS30B guns.
 2× Miniguns.
 4× General-purpose machine guns.

Countermeasures
 The Seagnat decoy system allows for the seduction and distraction of radar guided weapons, through active and passive means.
 Type 182 towed torpedo decoys.
 Type 2070 towed torpedo decoy system.
 Thales defence Scorpion Electronic Counter Measures/UAF-1 ESM Jammer. Used to confuse or block enemy radar making the Type 23 frigate harder to detect and or locked onto by enemy radar/sonar guided weapons.

Electronic systems
 Navigation: Kelvin Hughes Radar Type 1007 and Racal Decca Type 1008.
 fire-control system: Sperry Sea Archer 30 optronic surveillance/director'
 Combat Management System: BAE Systems Command System DNA(2)'

Additional capabilities
 The Type 23 frigates have sufficient space to embark a small detachment of Royal Marines and their equipment.

Ships

Although the Type 23 is officially the "Duke" class, and includes such famous names as HMS Iron Duke (which had been the name of the battleship , Admiral Jellicoe's flagship at the Battle of Jutland), five of the names had previously been used on classes known as the "County class": Kent and Norfolk were names given both to 1960s guided-missile destroyers and Second World War-era County-class heavy cruisers, while Monmouth, Lancaster, Kent and Argyll revived names carried by First World War-era Monmouth-class armoured cruisers. This use of Ducal and County names broke a tradition of alphabetical names for escort ships which had run in two – not unbroken – cycles from the L-class destroyers of 1913 to the s of 1950; this progression was revived with the Amazon-class Type 21 frigates of 1972–1975, and continued with B and C names for most of the Type 22 frigates of 1976–1989. However, the D names have since been used for the new Type 45 Daring-class destroyers.

In 2005 it was announced that these three vessels would be sold to the Chilean Navy, to be delivered in 2008. In September 2005 BAE Systems was awarded a £134 million GBP contract to prepare the frigates for transfer. ex-Marlborough, ex-Norfolk and ex-Grafton were sold to Chile for a total of £134 million. The letter of intent for purchase was signed in December 2004, followed by a formal contract on 7 September 2005. ex-Norfolk was handed over by the Defence Logistics Organisation and BAE Systems and commissioned into the Chilean Navy on 22 November 2006, and named Almirante Cochrane (FF-05) (after Lord Cochrane, a naval hero to both the British and Chileans). Ex-Grafton was delivered to Chilean Navy on 28 March 2007 at Portsmouth and renamed Almirante Lynch (FF-07). Ex-Marlborough was delivered to Chilean Navy on 28 May 2008 at Portsmouth and renamed Almirante Condell (FF-06). , these three ships remain in service with the Chilean Navy and were upgraded by Lockheed Martin Canada by the local ASMAR shipbuilding company.

The four oldest ships in Royal Navy service are classified as General Purpose ships, and are primarily homeported at Portsmouth. The remainder are equipped with the Type 2087 Towed Array Sonar, and are primarily tasked with the anti-submarine warfare mission. These eight ships are based primarily at Devonport. The Type 23 ships in the Royal Navy are due to be replaced in service by the Type 26 ASW and Type 31 general purpose frigates. The 2021 defence white paper indicated that both Montrose and Monmouth would be withdrawn early. Monmouth, having had the planned life-extension refit cancelled, and been laid up since 2018, was withdrawn from service in June 2021. Thereafter, the oldest remaining Type 23, had been due to be decommissioned in 2023, with approximately one ship per year decommissioned after that. However, in 2021 in a written answer provided to the House of Commons Select Defence Committee, the First Sea Lord, Admiral Tony Radakin, suggested that older frigates of the class would be retained in service longer than anticipated in order to ensure that escort numbers did not fall below 17 ships (6 destroyers and 11 frigates) and start to rise above 19 escorts beginning in 2026. If confirmed, this would mean that the older Type 23 frigates, such as Argyll, would have their anticipated service lives extended significantly.

In fiction
  was used for the Type 23 interior shots in the James Bond film Tomorrow Never Dies in three different roles as HMS Chester, HMS Devonshire and HMS Bedford. For the exterior shots a Type 23 model was constructed.
 The ITV series Making Waves was set aboard the Type 23 frigate HMS Suffolk (which was portrayed by ).
 The fictional HMS Beaufort is the centrepiece of British author Mike Lunnon-Wood's novel King's Shilling. In it, HMS Beaufort is tasked to evacuate the British embassy and citizens in the Liberian capital Monrovia during the 1990s civil war.

See also
 List of naval ship classes in service

References

Bibliography

External links

 

Frigates of the United Kingdom
Frigate classes
Ship classes of the Royal Navy